Monster Mash & Battleship is a 1980 video game published by Micro-80 Inc. for the TRS-80 16K.

Contents
Monster Mash & Battleship is two games, Monster Mash in which the big monster chases the smaller player around an open maze, and Battleship in which the player plays against the computer and each try to sink the other's ships.

Reception
Jon Mishcon reviewed Monster Mash & Battleship in The Space Gamer No. 41. Mishcon commented that "All in all, this is a very good buy for kids. The games are simple and well done. However, serious gamers will quickly find these games monotonous."

References

1980 video games
TRS-80 games
TRS-80-only games
Video games developed in the United States